Courtenay—Alberni is a federal electoral district in British Columbia. It encompasses a portion of B.C. formerly included in the electoral districts of Nanaimo—Alberni and Vancouver Island North.

Courtenay—Alberni was created by the 2012 federal electoral boundaries redistribution and was legally defined in the 2013 representation order. It came into effect upon the call of the 42nd Canadian federal election, scheduled for October 2015.

Demographics

According to the Canada 2011 Census

Languages: 90.8% English, 2.2% French, 1.8% German
Religions: 45.1% Christian (11.9% Catholic, 8.3% United Church, 7.7% Anglican, 2.5% Baptist, 2.0% Lutheran, 1.3% Presbyterian, 1.2% Pentecostal, 10.2% Other), 3.0% Other, 51.9% No religion 
Median income (2010): $26,754 
Average income (2010): $34,319 
Main industries: Retail trade (14.4% of labour force), Health care and social assistance (12.1%)

Members of Parliament

This riding has elected the following members of the House of Commons of Canada:

Election results

Notes

References

British Columbia federal electoral districts
British Columbia federal electoral districts on Vancouver Island
Courtenay, British Columbia
Parksville, British Columbia
Port Alberni